Dmytro Dmytrenko (also Dmitri Dmitrenko from ; born 25 July 1973) is a Ukrainian former competitive figure skater. While representing the Soviet Union, he won the 1992 World Junior title. For Ukraine, he won the 1993 European title and 2000 European bronze medal. He competed at the 1998 and 2002 Winter Olympics.

Dmytrenko formerly coached Oleksii Bychenko. He is an International Technical Specialist.

Programs

Results 
GP: Champions Series / Grand Prix

References

External links

Navigation

Soviet male single skaters
Ukrainian male single skaters
Ukrainian figure skating coaches
Olympic figure skaters of Ukraine
Figure skaters at the 2002 Winter Olympics
Figure skaters at the 1998 Winter Olympics
1973 births
Living people
European Figure Skating Championships medalists
World Junior Figure Skating Championships medalists
Sportspeople from Kyiv